Det ska va lätt is a 2014 studio album by Elisa's.

Track listing
Det ska va lätt
Tänk om vi aldrig
Kyss mig nu
Låt första tåren falla
Det är detta jag vill
California Blue
Lite kär
Vaken själv
Tre små ord
Crazy
Kärleken får ta en dag i sänder
Bilden av dig

Charts

References 

2014 albums
Elisa's albums
Swedish-language albums